William Kazmaier (born December 30, 1953) is an American former world champion powerlifter, world champion strongman and professional wrestler. During the 1970s and 1980s, he set numerous powerlifting and strongman world records, and won two International Powerlifting Federation (IPF) World Championships and three World's Strongest Man titles. In the 1980s, Kazmaier became famous for his claim to be "the strongest man who ever lived" by equaling and surpassing spectacular and versatile feats of strength of famous strongmen of the 20th century. He is widely considered to be one of the all-time greatest competitors in strength competitions.

Early career
Kazmaier is of German ancestry. A star athlete in high school, Kazmaier played football for two years at the University of Wisconsin–Madison before dropping out in 1974 to concentrate on lifting weights at the Madison YMCA. There he learned the fundamentals of powerlifting. Kazmaier then struggled to earn a living as an oil rigger, a bouncer, and a lumberjack.

Powerlifting career
At the 1978 Amateur Athletic Union (AAU) National Championships in Los Angeles, California, Kazmaier squatted 782 lbs, bench pressed 534 lbs, and deadlifted 804 lbs in the 275-pound weight class, which immediately placed him in the top rank in his first national powerlifting appearance. In 1979 at age 25, he set a world record with a bench press of 622 lbs on the way to winning his first IPF World Powerlifting Championship in Dayton, Ohio. His winning lifts included an 865 lbs squat, the 622 lbs bench press and an 804 lbs deadlift for a 2291 lbs total. He repeated the success in 1983 by first winning the United States Powerlifting Federation (USPF) National Powerlifting Championships in July and later the IPF World Championship in November for a second time. He won this IPF World Championship despite two major injuries. He had a severe pectoral injury, from which he never recovered completely, and shortly before the IPF Championships, had torn his hip flexors in the squat.

The world record bench press in early 1979 was 612 lbs, held by Lars Hedlund. Kazmaier moved the world record stepwise up from 617.3 lbs in July, 1979 to 622.8 lbs in November 1979 to 633.8 lbs in May, 1980 and finally to 661.4 lbs at the USPF West Georgia Open Powerlifting Championships, held in Columbus, Georgia on January 31, 1981. His winning lifts were: a  squat, the  bench press and an  deadlift. The bench press and deadlift were done raw (unequipped), while the squat was performed with wraps and a marathon squat suit. His powerlifting performance is regarded as one of the best of all time.
In November 1981, Kazmaier became one of the few lifters in history to hold world records in three of the four powerlifting events at the same time by setting a new deadlift world record at  raw in competition. From 1981 onwards Kazmaier's career was affected by multiple muscle tears and injuries, preventing him from setting the bar even higher. He sustained chest, shoulder and triceps injuries, ruling out further records in the bench press.

 * Jim Williams had bench pressed  (raw) earlier than Kazmaier in 1972 just prior to the formation of the IPF. But his lift was performed with ace bandage elbow wraps, which were later outlawed so it wouldn't count as the official world record.

Strongman career
Kazmaier competed in six World's Strongest Man contests. In 1979 World's Strongest Man, he came in third after leading throughout much of the competition and beating powerlifting icon Don Reinhoudt in the car lift by deadlifting a 2555 lbs car. In the following years, he dominated the competitions in 1980, 1981, and 1982, winning all by a large margin. He was the first man to win the WSM title three times and remains one of only two men ever to win it three times in a row.

In his 1980 title win, Kazmaier won five of ten events and tied for first in another. He won the log lift, the engine race, the steel bar bend, the girl squat lift, the silver dollar deadlift, and the final tug of war. The runner-up in the competition,  Lars Hedlund, was over 28 points behind.

After this tear, he lost more than one-hundred pounds off his bench press, making his 1983 IPF world championship win all that much more significant. Following his win in the squat he went on to win the silver dollar deadlift with a  lift. After his competitor failed to make the final lift, Kazmaier lifted the weight twice despite needing only one rep to secure the win. Of 11 events he had five wins, two second places, one third and a fourth. His wins included the log lift, deadlift, squat, loading race and engine race.

In the 1982 World's Strongest Man competition Kazmaier won the first three events. A notable performance in this WSM was his 1055 lbs silver dollar deadlift.

Despite being the reigning champion, the organizers decided not to invite Kazmaier to compete in the following four WSM competitions, with Kazmaier claiming it was because he was "too dominant". His absence cleared the way for Kazmaier's main rival, Geoff Capes, to win the title in 1983. Kazmaier continued to compete in lesser known strongman tournaments, such as the Scottish Power Challenge and the Le Defi Mark Ten International.

He returned to the World's Strongest Man Contest in 1988, where he won three of eight events – the log press, the deadlift and the sack race – and took two second places including the truck pull, but he was disqualified for moving his hands in the sausage forward hold, so the time was stopped prematurely. With two events to go, he was leading the field and was the favorite to win the following "weight over the bar event", in which a 56 lbs weight has to be thrown over a bar. He was holding the World Record in this event from the Highland Games 1984 with a height of 18 feet 3 inches. The event took place on water for the first time and Bill's concern about problems with his orientation on water were borne out. Although he threw the weight at least 3 feet higher than the bar, he failed to get the direction right. So he dropped out at only 15 feet 1 inch. With Kazmaier's closest rival Jón Páll Sigmarsson winning the event with a throw over 15 feet 7 inches, Kazmaier came in overall second to Jón Páll. Kazmaier had defeated Sigmarsson in 1987 at the Le Defi Mark Ten event in Canada, and also prior to WSM in 1988, at the World Musclepower Classic.

In Kazmaiers' final WSM appearance at the 1989 World's Strongest Man, he severely injured his ankle in the first event and already had a ripped biceps. He came in fourth, directly behind Jón Páll Sigmarsson. Kazmaier was the first man to press the "unliftable" Thomas Inch dumbbell* and became only the fifth person to lift it above the knee, setting this record on October 13, 1990.

In addition to WSM contests, Kazmaier also competed in other strongman competitions successfully, such as the Strongbow Strongman Challenge, the Scottish Power Challenge, Le Defi Mark Ten Challenge, the World Muscle Power Championships and the Pure Strength contest. He ended his career as a competitive strongman in 1990.

With three Worlds Strongest Man titles, Kazmaier is one of the most successful competitors in the history of the contest. Strength author David Webster called him "the greatest American strength athlete of all time", and a 2008 poll of experts rated him as top superheavyweight lifter of all time and "one of the strongest men who ever lived." He was featured in Flex magazine in May 2008, in which a top ten list of the strongest men in history was published where Kazmaier was voted "the third strongest man that ever lived", just behind Mark Henry and Žydrūnas Savickas.

Professional wrestling career
Inspired by Jim Thorpe, Kazmaier sought to transfer his talents to other sports, trying out for the NFL's Green Bay Packers in 1981. He also trained as a wrestler with Verne Gagne and Brad Rheingans, and entered professional wrestling in 1986, with a WWF match in Calgary, Alberta on November 10, 1986, defeating David Barbie. During the 1980s, he had wrestled for promotions such as Stampede Wrestling in Canada and Continental Championship Wrestling in America. He would also wrestle for Fighting Network RINGS in Japan in early 1991.

His biggest national exposure came when he debuted for World Championship Wrestling in the summer of 1991. He received several shots at Lex Luger's WCW World Heavyweight Championship but failed to win the title. He also briefly teamed with Rick Steiner, only to lose to The Enforcers in a tournament final for the WCW World Tag Team Championship. At Halloween Havoc 1991, in Chattanooga, he beat Oz by submission. At the 1991 Starrcade Battlebowl: The Lethal Lottery, Kazmaier and his partner Jushin "Thunder" Liger defeated Diamond Dallas Page and Mike Graham in Norfolk, Virginia. While in WCW, Kazmaier also wrestled for New Japan Pro-Wrestling. In NJPW, his theme music was "Poundcake" by Van Halen.

Life after competition
Kazmaier opened a fitness club, Kaz Fitness Center, in Auburn, Alabama in the early 1980s. The gym closed in 2005. Kazmaier then opened, and continues to operate, S.W.A.T. gym in Opelika, Alabama. Both served as a place for him to train and as headquarters for DynaKaz Inc., Kazmaier's own exercise equipment import-export company, which markets fitness products worldwide.

Upon retiring from active competition in the 1990s, Kazmaier was hired as a co-commentator for the American ESPN broadcast of the annual World's Strongest Man competition along with Todd Harris and 2006 World's Strongest Man winner Phil Pfister. He also comments in the British broadcast.

Kazmaier considers his most important contributions to public life to be his work as a motivational speaker for 3D Sports Tech, addressing school and YMCA groups. "I can and I will" is the message he conveys to inspire young people to lead healthier and more productive lives.

Personal life
Bill Kazmaier's nickname is "Kaz". He is the youngest child of William Bartholomew and Florence Louise Steinhoff Kazmaier. He had one brother, two sisters, and a half brother. His father owned soda water bottling plants in Burlington and Kenosha, Wisconsin.

In 1974 Kazmaier read a Bible verse in Psalm 40 while at the Madison YMCA and subsequently became a devoted Christian, crediting much of his success and exceptional strength to "the power of Jesus Christ." He lives in Auburn, Alabama and has a son, Eric.

Records

Powerlifting records

performed in 1981 in official powerlifting full meets
 Squat –  in 80s marathon squat suit
 Bench press –  raw
→ former IPF world record in SHW class (+regardless of weight class); surpassed by Ted Arcidi's 666.9 pounds (raw) in 1984
 Deadlift – * raw
→ former IPF world record in SHW class (+regardless of weight class); surpassed by Doyle Kenady's 903.9 pounds (equipped in deadlift suit) in 1986
 Total – 1100 kg (420.0/300.0/380.0) / 2425.08 lbs (925.9/661.4/837.8)* in 80s marathon squat suit
→ former IPF world record in SHW class (+regardless of weight class); surpassed by John Ware's 2427 pounds (equipped with squat suit and bench shirt) in 1989
* former all-time world records set in 1981

Career aggregate total (3 best official lifts) – 1122 kg (420 + 300 + 402) / 2474,0 lbs (925.9 + 661.4 + 886.7)

performed in 1983 Powerlifting Exhibition
 Deadlift –  with wrist straps

World's Strongest Man records
 Deadlift –  Raw, without wrist straps, at 1981 Highland Games. This lift was officially  but later weighed out to be . Judged by Douglas Edmunds.
 Car Lift (Deadlift) -  car – winning lift 1979 (lifting two tires off the ground)
 Cement Block Lift (Squat on Smith Machine) –  winning lift, WSM 1981
 Silver Dollar Deadlift –  winning lift WSM 1982 (18" off the floor with wrist straps)
 Overhead Log Lift –  winning lift WSM 1988 (awkward wooden log with great circumference) It has been noted that in 1988 logs used for the Log Lift were not machined as they are in modern competitions, and were extremely unbalanced in weight. Bill pressed the log with ease, using absolutely no leg drive.
 Hungarian Farm Cart Deadlift –  winning lift WSM 1988

Other Feats
 Seated Military Press –  for 3 reps.

Achievements
Professional Competitive Record – [1st (18),2nd (4), 3rd (4) – Out of Total(29)]
International winning percentage of 44.5%

COMPLETED CONTESTS

 Pure Strength 4 Team Challenge – winner (1990)
 World's Strongest Man – 4th place (1989)
 Pure Strength 3 Team Challenge – 2nd place (1989)
 Scottish Power Challenge – winner (1989)
 World's Strongest Man – 2nd place (1988)
World Strongman Challenge – 3rd place (1988)
 Pure Strength 2 Team Challenge – winner (1988)
World Muscle Power Championships – winner (1988)
 Scottish Power Challenge – winner (1988)
 Pure Strength – Ultimate Challenge – 2nd place (1987)
 Le Defi Mark Ten Challenge – winner (1987)
 Scottish Power Challenge – winner (1987)
 Scottish Power Challenge – winner (1986)
World Muscle Power Championships – 3rd place (1985)
 Scottish Power Challenge – winner (1985)
 Scottish Power Challenge – winner (1984)
 World's Strongest Man – winner (1982)
 World's Strongest Man – winner (1981)
 Strongbow Superman Contest – winner (1981)
 Strongbow Strongman Contest – winner (1980)
 World's Strongest Man – winner (1980)
 World's Strongest Man – 3rd place (1979)

Career statistics
These are just a few of his accomplishments in his life: Second, shortly before the IPF Championships, he tore his hip flexors in the squat.
mentioned world records are records at that time
 Junior National Powerlifting Champion-275 Pound Class-(760-512-760-2033) in 1978
 Senior National Powerlifting Champion-275 Pound Class-(782-534-804-2121) in 1978
 World Record-Bench Press-Superheavyweight-617 lbs in 1979
 World's Strongest Man Contest-Third in 1979
 World Powerlifting Champion-Superheavyweight-(865-622-804-2292 lbs) in 1979
 World Record-Bench Press-Superheavyweight-622 lbs in 1979
 Strongbow Superman Contest-Winner-374 Clean and Jerk, 837 Deadlift, 120sX17 Dumbbell Press in 1980
 World Record-Bench Press-Superheavyweight-634 lbs in 1980
 World Record-56 lb Weight Toss Over Bar-Scottish Highland Games-Height: 16 feet and 3 inches in 1980
 World's Strongest Man Contest-Winner in 1980
 Strongbow Superman Contest-Winner in 1981
 World Record-Bench Press-Superheavyweight-639 lbs in 1981
 Powerlifting Competition-Best Squat-Superheavyweight-926 lbs lbs in 1981
 World Record-Bench Press-Superheavyweight-661 lbs in 1981
 World Record-Powerlifting Total-Superheavyweight-(926-661-837-2424 lbs) in 1981
 World Record-Dumbbell Press in Exhibition-a Pair of 155sX10 repetitions; a Pair of 165sX5 repetitions in 1981
 World's Strongest Man Contest-Winner in 1981
 World Record-Deadlift-Superheavyweight-887 lbs in 1981
 No.2 All-Time Squat in World's Strongest Man Competition of 969 lbs in 1981
 World's Strongest Man Contest-Winner in 1982
 Senior National Powerlifting Champion-Superheavyweight Class-(870-540-837-2248) in 1982
 No.3 All-Time Deadlift in World's Strongest Man Competition of 1055 lbs in 1982
 World Powerlifting Champion-Superheavyweight Class-(848-501-799-2149) in 1983
 Powerlifting Exhibition Best Deadlift-Superheavyweight-904 lbs in 1983
 World Record-56 lb. Weight Toss Over Bar-Scottish Highland Games-Height: 18 feet and 3 inches in 1984
 World Record-Barbell Curl-440 lbs in 1985
 Ultimate Challenge-Runner up in 1987
 Le Defi Mark Ten International-Winner in 1987 defeating Jon-Pall Sigmarsson
 World Record-Seated Barbell Press-(Previous Record: Chuck Arens-407) 448 lbsX3 in 1988
 World Muscle Power Classic-1st Place in 1988 defeating Jon-Pall Sigmarsson
 World Record Log Press-375 lbs in 1988
 World's Strongest Man Contest-Runner up in 1988
 Pure Strength II Team Competition-1st Place with Stuart Thompson as his partner in 1988
 McGlashen Stones-First Man to Ever Lift all Five Stones in Competition in 1988
 Louis Cyr Dumbbell Side Raise and Hold-(Louis Cyr-88 lbs in one hand and 97 lbs in the other); 89 lbs in one hand and 101 lbs in the other for 6 reps. in 1988
 Pure Strength II Team Competition-2nd Place with partner with OD Wilson in 1989
 Louis Cyr Dumbbell Front Raise and Hold-(Louis Cyr-131 lbs. for 1 rep.) 210 lbs for six reps.
 World's Strongest Man Competition-4th Place in 1989
 No.2 All-Time Loglift in World's Strongest Man Competition of 363 lbs in 1989
 World Record-Dumbbell Press-100 lbs.X40 reps in 1989
 Guinness Book of Records-Member of 10 Man Team that Pulled a 14-ton Tractor and Attached Caravan for 2 Miles
 Pure Strength III Team Competition-1st Place with O.D. Wilson as his partner in 1990

See also
 List of strongmen
 Progression of the bench press world record

References

External links

Online World Of Wrestling profile
Video of Kazmaier competing in WCW #1
Video of Kazmaier competing in WCW #2
WCW Tag-Team Championship Tournament Final

1953 births
American people of German descent
American powerlifters
American male professional wrestlers
American strength athletes
Living people
Sportspeople from Auburn, Alabama
People from Burlington, Wisconsin
Professional wrestlers from Wisconsin
Wisconsin Badgers football players
Stampede Wrestling alumni